The Supraclavicular fossa is an indentation (fossa) immediately above the clavicle.

In terminologia anatomica, it is divided into fossa supraclavicularis major and fossa supraclavicularis minor

Fullness in the supraclavicular fossa can be a sign of upper extremity deep venous thrombosis.

Additional Images

References

External links
 Diagram at droid.cuhk.edu.hk

Human head and neck
Triangles of the neck